Lophoceros is a genus of birds in the hornbill family, Bucerotidae, which are native to Africa.

Taxonomy
The genus Lophoceros was introduced in 1833 by the German naturalists Wilhelm Hemprich and Christian Gottfried Ehrenberg to accommodate Buceros, Lophoceros, forskålii. This is now considered as a junior synonym of the nominate subspecies of the African grey hornbill (Lophoceros nasutus nasutus). The genus name combines the Ancient Greek lophos meaning "crest" with kerōs meaning "horn".

The species now placed in this genus were formerly included in the genus Tockus. A molecular phylogenetic study published in 2013 found that Tockus was divided by a deep phylogenetic split into two major groups. The genus Lophoceros was therefore resurrected to contain one of these groups.

Species

The genus contains 7 species:

References 

 
Bird genera